This is a list of elections in the US state of Michigan in 2020. The office of the Michigan Secretary of State oversees the election process, including voting and vote counting.

To vote by mail, registered Michigan voters must request a ballot by October 30, 2020. As of early October some 2,760,076 voters have requested mail ballots.

Federal offices

President of the United States 

Nominees for the presidential election include Donald Trump, Joe Biden, and Jo Jorgensen.

United States Senate 

Gary Peters (incumbent, D) is running against John James (R), in addition to Marcia Squier (G), Doug Dern (Natural Law Party) and Valerie Willis (U.S. Taxpayers Party of Michigan).

United States House of Representatives 

Michigan voters will elect 14 candidates for the U.S. House of Representatives in the general election from each of the 14 congressional districts.

State offices

State executive offices 
There are 8 state executive offices open for election in Michigan's general election, including State Board of Education (2 seats), University of Michigan Board of Regents (2 seats), Michigan State University Board of Trustees (2 seats), and Wayne State University Board of Governors (2 seats).

State House of Representatives 

There are 110 seats in Michigan's House that are up for election in the general election. The Michigan Republican Party retained control of the chamber.

Supreme Court

2 of 7 seats on the Michigan Supreme Court are up for election and one is open after an incumbent retired. Supreme Court Justice Bridget McCormack is running for reelection. Each voter may select up to two candidates in the state Supreme Court general election; the top two vote-getters win the seats.

Candidates
Susan Hubbard (Green), judge of the Third Judicial Circuit Court of Michigan
Mary Kelly (Republican), St. Clair County prosecutor
Bridget Mary McCormack (Democratic), incumbent Chief Justice of the Supreme Court of Michigan
Kerry Lee Morgan (Libertarian), private practice attorney
Katie Nepton (Libertarian), attorney
Brock  Swartzle (Republican), incumbent Judge of the Michigan Court of Appeals for the 4th District
Elizabeth Welch (Democratic), employment lawyer

Polling

Results

Ballot measures 

There were two statewide legislatively referred constitutional amendments on the ballot for the general election:

 Proposal 1, Use of State and Local Park Funds Amendment: Revises formula for how state and local park funds from trusts can be spent
 Proposal 2, Search Warrant for Electronic Data Amendment: Requires search warrant to access a person's electronic data

Notes 

Partisan clients

See also 
 Elections in Michigan
 2020 United States elections

References

Further reading

External links
 
  (State affiliate of the U.S. League of Women Voters)
 
 
 
 . (Guidance to help voters get to the polls; addresses transport, childcare, work, information challenges)
 . ("Deadlines, dates, requirements, registration options and information on how to vote in your state")

 
Michigan elections by year
Michigan